Masoud Haji Akhondzade (born April 29, 1978 in Mashhad) is an Iranian judoka.

He finished in joint fifth place in the extra-lightweight (60 kg) division at the 2004 Summer Olympics, having lost the bronze medal match to Choi Min-Ho of South Korea. He won a gold medal in 2002 Busan Asian Games by defeating Bazarbek Donbay of Kazakhstan.

External links
Yahoo! Sports

1978 births
Living people
Sportspeople from Mashhad
Iranian male judoka
Judoka at the 2004 Summer Olympics
Judoka at the 2008 Summer Olympics
Olympic judoka of Iran
Asian Games gold medalists for Iran
Asian Games bronze medalists for Iran
Asian Games medalists in judo
Judoka at the 1998 Asian Games
Judoka at the 2002 Asian Games
Judoka at the 2006 Asian Games
Medalists at the 2002 Asian Games
Medalists at the 2006 Asian Games